Dolls is a 1987 American horror film directed by Stuart Gordon, written by Ed Naha, and starring Stephen Lee, Guy Rolfe, Hilary Mason, Ian Patrick Williams, and Bunty Bailey. Its plot follows six people who seek shelter during a storm in the mansion of an elderly puppetmaker and his wife, only to find that the various puppets and dolls in the home contain the imprisoned spirits of criminals. It was produced by Charles Band and Brian Yuzna through Band's Empire Pictures.

The film grossed $3.5 million worldwide against a budget of $2 million and received mixed reviews from critics.

Plot
A violent thunderstorm strands young Judy, her father David, and her stepmother Rosemary in the English countryside. Seeking shelter, the trio break into a nearby mansion, where they meet the owners, a kindly older couple named Gabriel and Hilary Hartwicke. Learning that Judy has "lost" her beloved stuffed bear Teddy (in fact, the cruel Rosemary threw Teddy into the bushes), Gabriel gives Judy a doll named Mr. Punch. Three more people arrive at the mansion, also seeking shelter from the storm: Good-natured American businessman Ralph and English hitchhikers Isabel and Enid. Gabriel invites them all to stay the night.

Judy soon discovers that the mansion is full of beautifully detailed toys and dolls like Mr. Punch; Gabriel explains that he and his wife are toy makers. Judy and Ralph are both overjoyed, and the latter is something of a child at heart who has never given up his love and fondness of toys.

Isabel and Enid are actually petty thieves who hitchhiked with Ralph intending to pick his pocket. That night, Isabel sneaks out of her room to rob the mansion. Instead, she is brutally attacked by dolls who caught her in the midst of her thievery who then drag her into the darkness. Judy, in the hallway, briefly sees the attack and she rushes to tell her father David. However, David is a neglectful and uncaring father; both he and Rosemary accuse Judy of making up stories. Instead, Judy convinces Ralph to check out the hallway with her. Ralph is initially very skeptical, but he eventually begins believing Judy after her Mr. Punch doll briefly speaks to them.

Rosemary is later attacked by the dolls; in the midst of escaping them, she ends up accidentally overleaping out of a window to her death. Enid searches for Isabel and finds her almost entirely transformed into a doll version of herself. A horde of toys attack and kill Enid as she attempts to escape. Meanwhile, Ralph gets accidentally caught in a trap the dolls set for the other adults before Judy convinces them to save him; because he is her friend and has done nothing wrong. David discovers Rosemary's dead body placed in his bed and believes that Ralph killed her.

Now safe from the dolls, Judy and Ralph enter the workshop where the irate David finds them. Ralph tries to explain that the dolls attacked the others for their actions, but David refuses to listen, knocking both his daughter and Ralph unconscious in his rage. Then, Mr. Punch comes to life and attacks David. Other dolls intervene, dragging the unconscious Ralph and Judy away to safety as Mr. Punch is destroyed by David after a fierce struggle.

The Hartwickes appear and explain that they are a magician couple who see toys as the heart and soul of childhood. Gabriel and Hilary dislike the bitterness of adults, and when people seek shelter at their mansion, the dolls serve as a test for the visitors. People like Ralph (who appreciate the joy of childhood) and children like Judy are spared and leave the house with a fuller appreciation of life. However, those who refuse to change their ways (like David, Rosemary, Enid, and Isabel) can never leave and have to start all over and play a new role in the world as toys forever. As the Hartwickes explain this, the incredulous yet insane and threatening David is slowly (and agonizingly) transformed into a doll to replace Mr. Punch.

The next morning, the Hartwickes convince the reawakened Ralph and Judy that the night's events were just a dream. Gabriel reads a fake letter from David explaining to Judy that he and Rosemary are changing their names and leaving the country with Enid and Isabel. Judy will be able to stay permanently with her caring mother in Boston and that "David" has left Judy and Ralph enough money to buy plane tickets to Boston. Ralph and Judy leave the house, and as they drive away, Judy hints to him that if he would like to stay with her and her mother, he could be Judy's new father. Ralph seems interested in the idea.

The film ends with dolls of David, Rosemary, Enid, and Isabel sitting on a shelf while outside another car with a set of obnoxious parents gets stuck in mud near the mansion.

Cast

Production
Director Stuart Gordon came across Ed Naha's script for Dolls at Empire Pictures and became interested in directing it. Inspired by the book The Uses of Enchantment by Bruno Bettelheim, Gordon conceived the film as horror fairy tale in the vein of "Hansel and Gretel".

Dolls extensively uses stop motion animation by David W. Allen.

Reception
Dolls received mixed reviews. On Rotten Tomatoes, the film has an approval rating of 60%, based on reviews from 15 critics. On Metacritic, the film has a score of 55%, based on reviews from five critics, indicating "mixed or average reviews".

Roger Ebert's review of the film was mostly negative, commenting that Dolls lacks the energy and unapologetic excess of Stuart Gordon's two previous films. He also opined that dolls are intrinsically not frightening due to their cute appearance, writing, "The haunted house looks magnificent, but so what, if it's not haunted by great and frightening creatures? At some point Dolls remains only an idea, a concept. It doesn't become an engine to shock and involve us." He gave it two out of four stars.

Ain't It Cool News reviewed the DVD, calling it "a movie that really stands above the type of film you might expect from this era, with this subject matter." HorrorNews.net's Jeff Colebank listed the toymaking couple as one of the 13 Best Horror Movie Couples, stating that Rolfe was "the creepiest toymaker of them all". Allmovies review of the film was mildly favorable, calling it "a serious-minded, lovingly-crafted modern fairy tale that only misses classic status by a few clumsy, low-budget moments."

Home media
Dolls was released to DVD by MGM Home Entertainment on September 20, 2005, as a Region 1 widescreen DVD and by the Scream Factory division of Shout! Factory (under license from MGM) on November 11, 2014, as a Region A widescreen Blu-ray.

Cancelled sequel
Stuart Gordon was, at one point, interested in directing a sequel to this film. The initial story would have followed Judy and Ralph back to Boston in which Ralph would have married Judy's mother and they would become a family. One day Judy would receive a box sent from England that contained the toy makers, Gabriel and Hilary, as dolls. The sequel never entered production.

See also
 Killer Toys

References

External links
 
 
 
 Dolls at iHorror

1987 films
1987 horror films
American satirical films
American dark fantasy films
Empire International Pictures films
1980s English-language films
Films about dolls
Films directed by Stuart Gordon
Films set in country houses
Films set in England
Films about hitchhiking
Films about sentient toys
Horror films about toys
American supernatural horror films
Supernatural fantasy films
Films about witchcraft
Sentient toys in fiction
1980s American films